Ahmed Senoussi (born January 22, 1946) is a former Chadian high jumper.

He finished twelfth in the high jump final at the 1968 Olympic Games. He also competed at the 1972 Olympic Games without reaching the final.

References

External links
 
 
 
 

1946 births
Chadian male high jumpers
Athletes (track and field) at the 1968 Summer Olympics
Athletes (track and field) at the 1972 Summer Olympics
Olympic athletes of Chad
Living people
African Games bronze medalists for Chad
African Games medalists in athletics (track and field)
Athletes (track and field) at the 1965 All-Africa Games